Javier González (born 3 December 1949) is a Cuban weightlifter. He competed at the 1972 Summer Olympics and the 1976 Summer Olympics.

References

1949 births
Living people
Cuban male weightlifters
Olympic weightlifters of Cuba
Weightlifters at the 1972 Summer Olympics
Weightlifters at the 1976 Summer Olympics
Place of birth missing (living people)
World Weightlifting Championships medalists
Pan American Games medalists in weightlifting
Pan American Games silver medalists for Cuba
Weightlifters at the 1979 Pan American Games
20th-century Cuban people
21st-century Cuban people